Argyria subaenescens is a moth in the family Crambidae. It was described by Francis Walker in 1863. It is found in North America, where it has been recorded from Illinois.

References

Argyriini
Moths described in 1863
Moths of North America